William Sylvester Flanagan (April 9, 1901 – February 19, 1935) played for the Louisville Colonels of the National Football League during the 1926 NFL season.

Flanagan was born on April 9, 1901 in Green County, Wisconsin, the son of William H. Flanagan (1865–1939) and Marie Keegan Flanagan (1882–1972). He attended Beloit Memorial High School in Beloit, Wisconsin. He died in 1935.

Notes

References

External links

People from Green County, Wisconsin
Sportspeople from Beloit, Wisconsin
Players of American football from Wisconsin
Louisville Colonels (NFL) players
1901 births
1935 deaths